Jaag Utha Insan (1966 film) is a Pakistani Urdu language film released in 1966.

Cast
Zeba
Muhammad Ali
Waheed Murad
Firdous Begum
Ibrahim Nafees
Kamal Irani
Seema

Film songs

Awards

References

External links

Pakistani action films
Pakistani black-and-white films
1960s Urdu-language films
Urdu-language Pakistani films
1966 films